The Grossglockner, or just Glockner, is, at 3,798 metres above the Adriatic (12,461 ft), the highest mountain in Austria and the highest mountain in the Alps east of the Brenner Pass. It is part of the larger Glockner Group of the Hohe Tauern range, situated along the main ridge of the Central Eastern Alps and the Alpine divide. The Pasterze, Austria's most extended glacier, lies on the Grossglockner's eastern slope.

The characteristic pyramid-shaped peak actually consists of two pinnacles, the Grossglockner and the Kleinglockner (from German: groß, "big", klein, "small"), separated by the Glocknerscharte col.

Etymology 
The name Glocknerer is first documented in a 1561 map designed by the Viennese cartographer Wolfgang Lazius. The denotation Glogger is mentioned a 1583 description of the Tyrolean Kals legal district, then referring to the whole ridge south of the Alpine main chain. In the 1760s, the Atlas Tyrolensis listed a Glockner Berg, the prefix Gross- ("great") is not mentioned before the first expedition in 1799.

According to the scholar Belsazar Hacquet (1735–1815), Glockner is possibly derived from German: Glocke ("bell"), referring to the mountain's characteristic shape. It may also be a Germanised version of the Alpine Slavic word Klek ("mountain"), as maintained in the Slovene name Veliki Klek.

Geography

Location and area 

The Grossglockner lies on the border between the Austrian states of Carinthia and Tyrol (East Tyrol). This boundary is also the watershed between the Kals Valley and its Teischnitz and Ködnitz side valleys on the Tyrolean side and the Möll Valley with the Pasterze glacier on the Carinthian side. The region around the mountain has formed part of the Grossglockner-Pasterze special protected area within the High Tauern National Park since 1986.

That makes it one of the most independent peaks in the Alps. The view from the Grossglockner summit is one of the farthest of all mountains in the Eastern Alps.

Topography 

The Grossglockner rock summit, due to its high Alpine, heavily glaciated appearance, is often compared to the mountains of the Western Alps. Together with the Kleinglockner to the southeast it forms a distinctive double peak. There are differing views in the literature as to whether the Kleinglockner is a subpeak or a separate main summit. Due to its low topographic prominence and isolation as well as its close links in climbing history, it is counted as part of that of the Grossglockner in historic publications; however, in view of its separate climbing routes it is counted as an independent peak in mountaineering literature.

It runs northeastwards and borders on the Northeast and North Faces of the Grossglockner.

A prominent ridge, the Stüdlgrat, named after the Prague Alpinist Johann Stüdl (1839–1925), runs from the Grossglockner away to the southwest. Together with its extension, the Luisengrat, it separates the West Face and the Teischnitzkees glacier at its foot from the South Face and its Ködnitzkees glacier. A couloir known as the Pillwaxrinne crosses the South Face below the Obere Glocknerscharte; most of the South Face lies east of this gully below the Kleinglockner. The east side of the Kleinglockner, the Glocknerleitl, is glaciated to just below the summit and is continued by the Kleinglocknerkees and Hofmannskees before reaching the Pasterze.

History 

The history of the climbs started with French-born natural scientist Belsazar Hacquet, from 1773 professor of anatomy at the Academy of Ljubljana. He travelled the Eastern Alps from 1779 to 1781 and published an itinerary in 1783, describing the Glokner mountain and stating that it had not been climbed yet. He estimated the mountain's height with converted  and left an engraving illustrating Grossglockner and Pasterze, the first known depiction of the mountain.

First ascent
Inspired by Hacquet's book and the first ascent of the Mont Blanc in 1786, the Gurk prince-bishop Count Franz Xaver of Salm (1749–1822) together with his vicar general Sigismund Ernst Hohenwart (1745–1825) and Baron Franz Xaver von Wulfen (1728–1805) started efforts for a Grossglockner expedition. They engaged two peasants from Heiligenblut as mountain guides to do the first explorations for an ascent through the Leitertal valley, which is the side of Grossglockner with the least ice (people feared glaciers in these times). These valiant men, called "Glockners" in the records, did more than they were ordered to do—and probably reached the Kleinglockner summit on 23 July 1799.

One month later the bishop's expedition started: a mountain hut (the first Salm Hut) had been built and the path in the Leitertal valley was prepared so that the bishop could use a horse to reach it. 30 people, among them Salm, Hohenwart and Wulfen, were part of the expedition. They suffered with bad weather and a first effort failed, but on 25 August 1799 Hohenwart and at least four other people, including the two "Glockners", reached—again—the Kleinglockner, where they installed one of the first summit crosses (one of the main goals of the church expedition). Hohenwart's reports did not tell clearly that they had not touched the highest point but Bishop Salm (who had reached the Adlersruhe rock at ) was informed. Dissatisfied, he invited another, even bigger expedition the next year.

On 28 July 1800, 62 people, among them the pedagogue Franz Michael Vierthaler and the botanist David Heinrich Hoppe, started again into the Leitertal valley. Four peasants and carpenters (the "Glockners" and two others who are not known) did a track in the snow, had installed fixed ropes at some steeper sections up to the end of the Glocknerleitl, and even built a second refuge, called Hohenwarte Hut. The vanguard reached the Kleinglockner peak, however, according to the expedition records by the Dellach priest Franz Joseph Horasch (Orasch), only the four guides and Mathias Hautzendorfer, the local priest of the Rangersdorf parish, were able to cross the Obere Glocknerscharte and climb the Grossglockner summit. Hautzendorfer had to be persuaded to venture the step and administered the last rites in advance. 

The two "Glockners" are usually identified as the brothers Joseph (Sepp) and Martin Klotz, however, this surname is not listed in the Heiligenblut parish register. A local peasant named Sepp Hoysen is documented as a member of the second Grossglockner expedition in 1802, and the surveyor Ulrich Schiegg mentioned one Martin Reicher as "Glockner" guide. The peasants and several other members of the expedition (among them Schiegg and his young apprentice Valentin Stanič, who climbed Mt. Watzmann for the first time some weeks later) did the ascent again the next day and finally installed the summit cross and a barometer on the Grossglockner summit.

Development
Bishop Salm undertook two more ascents in 1802 (with Hohenwart reaching the summit) and in 1806, however, he himself never climbed beyond the Adlersruhe rock. The climbing of the Grossglockner was also described by the botanist Josef August Schultes, who explored the massif together with Count Apponyi in 1802. No further ascents were made during the Napoleonic Wars, the huts decayed and were plundered by locals. In the following Vormärz era, however, the mountain became a popular venue for Alpinists like Hermann and Adolf Schlagintweit, who all followed the route of the first ascent.

By the mid 19th century, the developing Alpine tourism began to alter the traditional agriculture economy in the Heiligenblut area. Therefore, the people of Kals tried to lay out a straight ascent from the western side, which however was not reached until Julius von Payer explored the ridge between Glöcknerleitl and Ködnitzkees in 1863. Johann Stüdl had a via ferrata erected along the southwestern ridge the next year and the Stüdlhütte erected at its foot in 1868. Already in 1869, most expeditions to the summit started in Kals. The first winter ascent of the Grossglockner was made on January 2, 1875 by William Adolf Baillie Grohman, a member of the Alpine Club. In 1876 Count Pallavicini and his guide Hans Tribusser undertook the first expedition up the steep glaciated Northeast Face, chopping 2,500 steps into the Pallavicinirinne in an ice climbing master stroke not repeated for 23 years.

In 1879 Count Pallavicini dedicated a new iron summit cross on the occasion of the silver wedding of Emperor Franz Joseph of Austria and Empress Elisabeth; both had visited Heiligenblut and walked to the present-day Franz-Josefs-Höhe viewpoint in 1865. The cross was installed on 2 October 1880. Pallavicini also had the Archduke John Hut erected at the former Adlersruhe resting place of Bishop Salm, today the highest situated mountain hut in Austria. The Austrian Alpine Club built the new Salmhütte and the Glocknerhaus along the alpine route from Heiligenblut.

A first ascent by skiing was made in 1909 and the circumnavigation of the massif soon became a popular ski mountaineering tour. The Grossglockner became Austria's highest mountain, when the South Tyrolean Ortler region had to be ceded to the Kingdom of Italy according to the 1919 Treaty of Saint-Germain, which promoted its reputation as a tourist attraction.

High Alpine Road 

Mass tourism was decisively promoted by the scenic High Alpine Road (Großglockner-Hochalpenstraße) running from Heiligenblut to Bruck in Salzburg with a branch-off to the Franz-Josefs-Höhe viewpoint. It was built across the historic Hochtor Pass of the Alpine divide between 1930 and 1935 according to plans designed by engineer Franz Wallack. The pass road, Austria's highest, reaches , and is one of the most popular tourist attractions in the country (second after Schönbrunn Palace) with about 270,000 vehicles and 900,000 visitors every year, about 50 million since its opening.

See also 

 
 Pasterze Glacier

References

External links 

 Alpine Journal Account of First Ascent- AJ 1964 244-248 

 Grossglockner Hochalpenstrasse
 
 Topographic maps of the Grossglockner

Computer-generated virtual panoramas
 North
 South
 Index
 Grossglockner webcam with daily time-lapse animations

Alpine three-thousanders
Mountain ranges of Carinthia (state)
Mountains of the Alps
Glockner Group
Highest points of countries